Robert Crawley may refer to:
Robert L. Crawley (fl. 1970–1984), American politician from Massachusetts
Robert Crawley, 7th Earl of Grantham, character in UK TV series Downton Abbey